Asoka de Silva may refer to:
Asoka de Silva (admiral) (1931–2006), Sri Lankan Navy officer
Asoka de Silva (cricketer) (born 1956), Sri Lankan cricket umpire and former player
Asoka de Silva (judge) (born 1946), Sri Lankan Chief Justice